Galaxy  is a former provider of pay television programming in Australia via satellite and wireless cable (microwave) delivery methods.

Galaxy was founded in 1993, and began test broadcasting on 1 January 1995 via microwave transmission, making it the first provider of pay-TV services in the country. It was officially launched on Australia Day (26 January).
 At launch only two channels were fully operational, the local Premier Sports and international news channel ANBC. Digital satellite broadcasts began in September 1995.

Galaxy was a joint venture between Continental Century Pay-TV and Australis Media.  Each held licenses allowing them to provide four channels of satellite delivered television

Continental Century Pay-TV and Australis Media held exclusive licenses to broadcast pay-TV in Australia via satellite until 1997. Their main competitors were Foxtel and Optus Vision, both of which operated separate cable networks. The Galaxy channel package was franchised to CETV (Later Austar) and East Coast Television in regional areas.

At its peak, there were around 120,000 Galaxy subscribers. The service ceased shortly after Australis Media went into liquidation on 18 May 1998.

History

In January 1992, the Government of Australia called tenders for Australia's first pay-TV licenses. Surprisingly, the first license was purchased not by one of the major media players but by an entrepreneur, Albert Hadid, who quickly onsold it for a rumoured $33 million profit. The licenses ultimately ended up in the hands of Continental Century Pay-TV, a joint venture between Australian venture capitalist CVC and US cable company Century Communications (now part of Charter Communications) and Australis Media, an upstart company in which TCI and Guinness Peat Group were major shareholders. Australis paid a total of A$333 million for the satellite and microwave licenses they would require to launch a pay-TV service to be branded Galaxy.

Galaxy secured contracts with three major Hollywood studios –Sony Pictures Motion Picture Group, Universal Studios and Paramount Pictures (the latter two both partners on a joint venture, United International Pictures)– for the exclusive first-run rights to broadcast their film and TV product on its Galaxy service. The output of these studios formed three channels – Showtime, Encore and TV1 – that would become the mainstay of Galaxy's programming.

After the remaining output from the major studios was purchased by Optus Vision, Galaxy's other competitor, the News Corporation and Telstra owned Foxtel, was forced into an embarrassing deal to purchase content from Australis at a reported cost of A$4.5 billion over 25 years.

Despite this lucrative deal, the financial situation at Australis was troubling. The installation cost of equipment was high (reportedly around $500 for a microwave antenna and $1000 for a satellite dish), forcing them to greatly subsidise installation costs. Furthermore, increased competition from Foxtel and Optus Vision forced Galaxy to lower prices further or lose customers.

The financial crisis at Australis meant that much of Galaxy's life seemed to be spent trying to save the company from receivership. In October 1995 a merger was proposed by Australis and its biggest rival, Foxtel. The proposal was rejected by the Australian Competition & Consumer Commission (ACCC), citing fears that a merger between the two businesses would stifle competition. Another Australis-Foxtel merger was proposed in July 1997 but was also vetoed for similar reasons. Another proposal made in August 1996 under which Australis and Optus would share satellite infrastructure (while still trading separately) was approved by the ACCC but later blocked by the Federal Court of Australia.

With hopes of a merger dashed and serious cashflow problems continuing to plague the company, Australis relied on "rescue packages" of capital injections from a number of new investors (including Kerry Packer's PBL, among others) to stay afloat.

On 18 May 1998 the Supreme Court of New South Wales declared that Australis was insolvent and the company went into liquidation. It has been estimated that losses totalled A$800 million. Of those who purchased assets after the company's collapse, the biggest beneficiary was likely their biggest competitor Foxtel, who were able to purchase Galaxy's 65,000 remaining subscribers as well as terminate their crippling programming deal and renegotiate directly with the studios.

There has been considerable controversy over the role Foxtel may have played in Galaxy's demise: in 2003 it was the target of legal action by Australis bondholders, who sued Foxtel's parent company News Corporation for the $6 billion which they alleged Australis would have earned had it not lost the rights to the programming content.

Legacy
After Australis's insolvency, its eight channels continued to run on the Foxtel platform, and five of them are present in some form on all the major pay television providers in Australia. Two of Galaxy's general entertainment channels, TV1 and Arena, are part of the basic entertainment package on Foxtel (although TV1 closed down on 31 December 2013), Galaxy's sport service became Fox Sports, Galaxy's music channel Red was renamed Channel V in 1997, and Galaxy's two movie channels ran as Showtime Australia until 2012, when it merged with the Movie Network to become Foxtel Movies.

See also

Subscription television in Australia

References

External links
 Australis Background – an in-depth log of the life of Australis Media
 Rupert's killer of a deal – a news article on the allegations that Foxtel unfairly contributed to Galaxy's death.
 An extract from Mark Westfield's 'Gatekeepers' which recounts the negotiations between Australis and PBL for the first rescue package.
 The Demise of Australis – an editorial using the death of Galaxy as an example of the negative effects of Australian media regulations.
 Online news article announcing that Australis has collapsed.

Australian subscription television services
Companies based in Sydney
Defunct broadcasting companies of Australia
Mass media companies established in 1993
Mass media companies disestablished in 1993
1993 establishments in Australia
1998 disestablishments in Australia